Auberville-la-Campagne is a former commune in the Seine-Maritime department in the Normandy region in northern France. On 1 January 2016, it was merged into the new commune of Port-Jérôme-sur-Seine.

Geography

Population

Places of interest
 The church of St.Jean-Baptiste, dating from the thirteenth century.
 Ruins of a medieval castle donjon.
 The Château du Carouge.

See also
Communes of the Seine-Maritime department

References

Former communes of Seine-Maritime